Colorado Community Colleges Online is part of the Colorado Community College System. It provides online courses, development, and support for the other community colleges in the system.

External links
 Their website

 
Education in Colorado